Vishaal de Mal is a shopping mall in the city of Madurai, Tamil Nadu. It is the 20th large format mall in southern Tamil Nadu and the city's first integrated multi-utility mall.

About the mall
The mall has a  play area with games like dashing cars and bowling. It has a  food court, which includes Marybrown. The mall houses department stores, apparel and jewelry shops.

The mall houses has India's first 7D+ experience theater.

The mall has another theater with five Inox screens with a total capacity of 1302 (the screens have 166, 178, 350, 318, and 290 seats respectively). It has a parking capacity of about 150 cars.

See also
 List of shopping malls in India
 List of shopping malls in Tamil Nadu

References

External links
 
 
https://in.bookmyshow.com/madurai/cinemas/inox-vishaal-de-mall/INVS for booking tickets online.

Shopping malls in Madurai
Shopping malls established in 2012
2012 establishments in Tamil Nadu